Harry Cecil Butcher (November 1, 1901 – April 20, 1985) was an American radio broadcaster who served during World War II as the Naval Aide to General Dwight D. Eisenhower from 1942 to 1945.

Early life
Harry C. Butcher was born in Springville, Iowa on November 1, 1901. Following his graduation from Iowa State College, in 1929 Butcher began a career in radio broadcasting. He opened the Washington, D.C. office of CBS and served as its director until 1932. Beginning in 1932, he was the manager, and later vice-president, of the CBS Radio Network's station in Washington, D.C. station WJSV. While there, Butcher coined a term for President Franklin Roosevelt's radio speeches to the American public, used by Robert Trout introducing the president's address on March 12, 1933, and again by Butcher written in a press release, referring to the May 7, 1933 address as a "fireside chat".

Military career

During his tenure at WJSV, Butcher was commissioned a Lieutenant Commander in the United States Navy Reserve (U.S.N.R.) on September 16, 1939. From 1942 to 1945, Butcher served as the Naval Aide to General Dwight D. Eisenhower. On May 1, 1943, Butcher was promoted to the rank of commander in the U.S.N.R. On November 1, 1944 he was promoted to the temporary rank of captain. Following an order given to him by Eisenhower, Butcher kept a diary of his and Eisenhower's wartime activities. The diary would come to be published in 1946 under the title "My Three Years with Eisenhower." It also led to historian Max Hastings referring to him as "the embodiment of all gossip-ridden staff officers".

It was Butcher who preserved the written statement that Eisenhower had prepared in the event that the D-Day invasions failed.

Later life
Butcher returned to the broadcasting world following the end of WWII. From 1946 to the 1970s, Butcher owned the radio station KIST in Santa Barbara, California. He also served as president of Santa Barbara's cable TV corporation and as a radio/television consultant.

On April 20, 1985, Butcher died in Santa Barbara, California, United States.

References

External links
 Papers of Harry C. Butcher, Dwight D. Eisenhower Presidential Library
 Inventory of the Harry C. Butcher papers, 1930–1977 (Bulk 1930–1956), Rocky Mountain Online Archive, University of Minnesota (2013)

1901 births
1985 deaths
People from Linn County, Iowa
Iowa State University alumni
Radio personalities from Iowa
American businesspeople in mass media
Military personnel from Iowa
20th-century American naval officers
United States Navy personnel of World War II
American diarists
Dwight D. Eisenhower
People from Santa Barbara, California

20th-century diarists